Kaviraz Krishna Murthy Sastry, of Sripada family (29 October 1866 – 29 December 1960), a native of Devarapalli of West Godavari district, was the first poet laureate ((ఆస్థాన కవి Asţhānakavi)) of Andhra Pradesh. He composed more than a hundred works in Telugu. He composed ‘Sri Krishnasweeyacharitam’, an autobiography in Sanskrit.

Birth
Saastry was born to Sripada Venkata Somayajulu and Venkata Subbamma on 29 October 1866 at Ernagudem, West Godavar district of Andhra Pradesh.

Marriage
He was married to Venkata Ratnamba (వెంకట రత్నాంబ Venkataratnāmba), daughter of Kala Lakshminarayana and Kala Somidevamma of Nadipudi village near Narasapur in West Godavari district. Thus, he became co-brother of French-era politician of Yanaon, Bouloussou Soubramanion Sastroulou and brother-in-law of Kala Venkata Rao, former minister of Madras and Andhra Pradesh.

Awards and titles

His awards including Padma Sri in 1958, Suvarna Gandapenderam, Mani Kireetam, Mahamahopadhyaya insignia and medallions are preserved at the Visakha Museum, at Visakhapatnam. His titles include 
 Mahamahopadhyaya (మహామహోపాధ్యాయ)
 Kavisarvabhauma (కవిసార్వభౌమ)
 Kaviraz (కవిరాజు)
 Kavibrahma (కవిబ్రహ్మ)
 Andhra Vyasa (ఆంధ్రవ్యాస)
 Abhinava Srinadha (అభినవ శ్రీనాథ)
 Vedavidya Visarada (వేద విద్యా విశారద)
 Prasanna Valmiki (ప్రసన్న వాల్మీకి)
 Kala Prapoorna (కళాప్రపూర్ణ)

Death
He died in Rajahmundry on 29 December 1960.

References

Telugu poets
1866 births
1960 deaths
People from West Godavari district
Poets from Andhra Pradesh
Indian autobiographers
Indian male poets
19th-century Indian poets
20th-century Indian poets
19th-century Indian male writers
20th-century Indian male writers
Recipients of the Padma Shri in literature & education